Bendamurulanka is a village in Allavaram Mandal, Dr. B.R. Ambedkar Konaseema district in the state of Andhra Pradesh in India.

Geography 

Demographics 
 India census, Bendamurulanka had a population of 8576, out of which 4278 were male and 4298 were female. The population of children below 6 years of age was 10%. The literacy rate of the village was 78%.

References 

Villages in Allavaram mandal